Norsel Iceport, also known as Norselbukta or Bukhta Nursel, is a small iceport in the front of the Quar Ice Shelf, along the coast of Queen Maud Land.

Discovery and naming
This feature was named by the Norwegian–British–Swedish Antarctic Expedition (NBSAE), 1949–52, which used it to moor and unload the expedition ship . The low ice front permitted easy access onto Quar Ice Shelf, where the NBSAE established Maudheim Station about 1 nautical mile south of the iceport.

See also
 Ice pier
 Atka Iceport
 Erskine Iceport
 Godel Iceport
 Bay of Whales

References

External links

Ports and harbours of Queen Maud Land